Gordon is a masculine given name in the English language.  The name is derived from the Scottish surname Gordon.  It is uncertain if this surname originated from a place name in Scotland or in France.  The Gordon in Berwickshire, where the family who bore the surname held lands in the 12th century, is of uncertain etymology.  It is also possible that this place name was named after settlers from France, who were named after a like-named place in Normandy.  The surname is thought to have been taken up as a given name in honour of the Major-General Charles George Gordon, a British army officer who was killed in 1885, in Khartoum.

Origin of the name
The given name Gordon originates from a transferred use of the Scottish surname Gordon.  The origin of this surname is debated.  While it is considered to be derived from a place name, it is not certain that the place name of Gordon, in Berwickshire, Scotland, is the origin of the surname. Berwickshire was once the home of Clan Gordon, and the earliest member of the family on record is of Richer de Gordun, who was lord of the barony of Gordon, in the mid-12th century. This place name may be derived from the Brythonic gor, meaning "spacious"; and din or dun, meaning "fort" (Irish: dún, Scottish: dùn, Welsh: dun, din).

However, it is also possible that the Scottish surname originated from a place name in Normandy, France, and was brought over to Scotland, where it gave rise to the place name in Berwickshire. For example, the English surname Gordon is considered to be derived from Gourdon in Saône-et-Loire, France. Early records of this surname occur in England in the early 13th century (such as Adam de Gurdon, in 1204). This French place name is derived from the Gallo-Roman personal name Gordus and the locative suffix -o, -onis.

The given name is thought to have been used in honour of Major-General Charles George Gordon (1833–85), who was killed at Khartoum.

Variants, cognates
The masculine given name can be represented in Scottish Gaelic as Gòrdan.

The diminutives Gord or Gordie may also be used as a nickname.

List of people
 Saint Gordon of Rome or Saint Gordianus (d. 362), Roman saint martyred under Julian the Apostate 
 Gordon (slave) (fl. 1863), African-American slave and US Civil War soldier
 Gordon Abbott (1914–1986), Australian rules footballer
 Gordon Allport (1897–1967), American psychologist
 Gord Ash (b. 1951), assistant general manager for the Milwaukee Brewers
 Gordon Bajnai (b. 1968), Hungarian politician, ex-Prime Minister of Hungary
 Gordon Banks (1937–2019), English football player
 Gordon Bell (b. 1934), American computer engineer
 Gordon Brown (b. 1951), Scottish politician, the former Prime Minister of the United Kingdom
 Gordon Burgess (b. 1935), president of Tangipahoa Parish, Louisiana, USA
 Gordon Campbell (disambiguation), multiple people
 Vere Gordon Childe (1892–1957), Australian archaeologist
 Gordon Luke Clarke (b. 1945), New Zealand-born 1970s fashion designer
 Gordon Stanley "Mickey" Cochrane (1903–1962), American baseball player
 Gordon Cooper (1927–2004), American astronaut
 Gordon Cummins 1914–1942), British serial killer
 Gordon R. Dickson (1923–2001), American science fiction author
 Gordon Downie (1964–2017), Canadian singer/songwriter, lead singer of the Canadian band The Tragically Hip
 Gordon Frickers (b. 1949), English marine, aviation and landscape artist
 Gordon Gano (b. 1963), American singer/songwriter/guitarist, lead singer of Wisconsin proto-alternative group The Violent Femmes
 Gordon Getty (b. 1933), American, son of oil tycoon J. Paul Getty
Gordon Giltrap (b. 1948), English guitarist 
 Gordon Gore (1913–1987), American football player
 Gordon Gould (1920–2005), American physicist
 Gordon Hayward (b. 1990), American basketball player
 Gordon Hayward (cricketer) (1926–2014), English cricketer
 Gordon Heuckeroth (b. 1968), Dutch singer and radio and television presenter, under the name Gordon
 Gordon B. Hinckley (1910–2008), American, 15th president of The Church of Jesus Christ of Latter-day Saints
 Gordon Hookey (b. 1961), Australian aboriginal artist
 Gordon Howe (1928–2016), Canadian hockey player
 Gord Johns (b. 1969), politician from British Columbia, Canada
 Gordie Johnson (b. 1964), Canadian musician
 Gordon Korman (b. 1963), Canadian-American children's book author
 Gord Kluzak (b. 1964), retired Canadian NHL defenceman for the Boston Bruins
 G. Gordon Liddy (1930–2021), American, jointly organized break-in of the Democratic National Committee headquarters in the Watergate scandal
 Gordon Lightfoot (b. 1938), Canadian singer-songwriter
 Gordon Lish (b. 1934), American writer
 Gordon Lonsdale (1922–1970), Russian spy
 Gordon Lunan (1914–2005), Canadian spy for the Soviet Union
 Gord Mackintosh (b. 1955), politician in Manitoba, Canada
 Gord Martineau (b. 1947), Canadian television journalist
 Gordon Matta-Clark (1943–1978), American artist
 Gordon W. McKay (1910–1990), American businessman and politician
 Gordon McRae (b. 1948), Canadian professional hockey player, retired
 Gordon MacRae (1921–1986), American actor and singer
 Gord Miller (sportscaster) (b. 1965), Canadian sportscaster for the cable network TSN
 Gord Miller (politician) (1924– 2021), former politician in Ontario, Canada
 Gord Miller (environmental commissioner) (b. 1953), the current Environmental Commissioner of Ontario, Canada
 Gordon Moakes, English musician, member of Bloc Party
 Gordon Moore (b. 1929), American businessman
 Gordon Murray (b. 1946), South African designer of Formula One race cars
 Gordon Orlikow (b. 1960), Canadian decathlon, heptathlon, and hurdles competitor, Athletics Canada Chairman, Canadian Olympic Committee member, Korn/Ferry International partner
 Gordon Owen (b. 1959), English footballer
 Gordon Parks (1912–2006), American photographer and film director
 Gordon Pask (1928–1996), English cybernetician and psychologist
 Gord Perks (b. 1963), Canadian environmentalist, political activist, and writer
 Gordon Pinsent (1930–2023), Canadian actor
 Gordon Ramsay (b. 1966), Scottish celebrity chef
 Gordon Raphael, American record producer and musician
 Gordon Rohlehr (1942–2023), Guyana-born scholar of West Indian literature
 Gordon Rosenmeier (1907–1989), American politician and lawyer
 Gordon Sanderson (1976–1977), Canadian murder victim
 Gordon Schildenfeld (b. 1985), Croatian footballer
 Gordon Scott (1926–2007), American actor primarily known for playing Tarzan in theatrical films of mid- to late-1950s
 Gordon Shattock (1928–2010), British veterinarian, Conservative politician and survivor of the Brighton hotel bombing
 Gord Sinclair, bass guitarist for the popular Canadian rock group The Tragically Hip
 Gordon Slethaug, American professor of English
 Gordon Smiley (1946–1982), American race car driver
 Gordon Smith (disambiguation), multiple people
 Gord Spence (1897–1984), Canadian ice hockey player who played one season in the National Hockey League
 Gordon Strachan (b. 1957), Scottish football player and manager
 Gordon Sumner (b. 1951), English performing artist known as Sting
 Gordon Thomson (disambiguation), multiple people
 Gordon Tietjens (b. 1955), New Zealand rugby sevens coach
 Gordon Walker (disambiguation), multiple people
 Gordon Waller (1945–2009), Scottish singer-songwriter and guitarist, one half of the duo Peter and Gordon
 R. Gordon Wasson (1898–1986), American psychedelic writer
 Gordon Williams (disambiguation), multiple people
 Gordon S. Wood (b. 1933), American historian

Other name
 Paul Gordon Georges (1923–2002), American painter

Fictional characters
Gordon the Big Engine, from The Railway Series and Thomas and Friends
Gordon Bombay, from The Mighty Ducks
Gordon Brittas, from the BBC sitcom The Brittas Empire
 Gordon Collins (Brookside), fictional character from British soap opera Brookside
 Gordon the Gopher, puppet character from various British children's TV programmes
 Gordon Freeman, the main protagonist of Half-Life
 Gordon Gekko, protagonist of Wall Street
 Gordon Quid, character from Catscratch
 Gordon Robinson (Sesame Street), from the children's educational television program Sesame Street
 Gordon Shumway, the extraterrestrial lead in the U.S. sitcom ALF
 Gordon Tracy, fictional character from Thunderbirds
 Gordon Walker, hunter in the television series Supernatural
 Commissioner Gordon, a police officer in Batman
 Gordon, Character in the 1990 Addams Family movie
 Gordon, a bear from Camp Lazlo
 Gordon Harmann, character from the Total Conquest Universe

See also
 Gorden

References

English-language masculine given names
English masculine given names
Given names originating from a surname
Scottish masculine given names

de:Gordon (Name)